Tezerj (also Romanized as Tezarj and Taz̄arj; also known as Tajarak, Tedjerek, and Tejerk) is a village in Sarbanan Rural District, in the Central District of Zarand County, Kerman Province, Iran. As of the 2006 census, its population was 41, in 16 families.

References 

Populated places in Zarand County